Bathysaurus mollis is a species of fish in the family Bathysauridae, commonly called bathysaur or highfin lizardfish.

References
 
Kenneth J. Sulak, Charles A. Wenner, George R. Sedberry, and Louis Van Guelpen, The life history and systematics of deep-sea lizard fishes, genus Bathysaurus (Synodontidae), Can. J. Zool. 63(3): 623–642 (1985).

Aulopiformes
Fish described in 1878
Taxa named by Albert Günther